Clarksburg Township is located in Shelby County, Illinois. As of the 2010 census, its population was 401 and it contained 177 housing units.

Geography

Adjacent townships
 Shelbyville Township (north)
 Richland Township (northeast)
 Prairie Township (east and southeast)
 Holland Township (south)
 Lakewood Township (west)
 Rose Township (northwest)

Demographics

References

External links
City-data.com
Illinois State Archives

Townships in Shelby County, Illinois
Townships in Illinois